Illi Lake is a lake in Illi, Tartu County, Estonia.

See also
 List of lakes of Estonia

Lakes of Estonia
Nõo Parish